Bakhtsug is a rural locality (a selo) in Ikrinsky Selsoviet, Kurakhsky District, Republic of Dagestan, Russia. The population was 163 as of 2010.

Geography 
Bakhtsug is located 28 km southeast of Kurakh (the district's administrative centre) by road, on the Kukirkam River. Akhnig and Shtul are the nearest rural localities.

Nationalities 
Lezgins live there.

References 

Rural localities in Kurakhsky District